"Thanks for the Memory" (1938) is a popular song composed by Ralph Rainger with lyrics by Leo Robin. It was introduced in the 1938 film The Big Broadcast of 1938 by Bob Hope and Shirley Ross, and recorded by Shep Fields and His Orchestra featuring John Serry Sr. on accordion in the film and vocals by Bob Goday on Bluebird Records (B-7318, 1937). Dorothy Lamour's solo recording of the song was also popular, and has led to many mistakenly believing over the years that it was she who sang the tune with Hope in the film (in which Lamour also appeared).

In the film, Ross and Hope's characters are a divorced couple who encounter each other aboard a ship. Near the film's end, they poignantly sing one of the many versions of this song, recalling the ups and downs of their relationship (then they decide to get back together).

In the fifth verse of the song for the film, Robin recalled the couple’s romantic weekend in Niagara. His original lyrics were: "That weekend at Niagara when we never saw the falls." However, this was rejected by the film producers who feared it was too suggestive. Robin was furious and a bitter row ensued with neither side giving way. Finally a compromise was reached that has Bob Hope singing: "That weekend at Niagara when we hardly saw the falls." The lyricist never forgave this censorship: he considered it ridiculously prissy and that it ruined the song. However, the way that Shirley Ross responds with, "How lovely that was!" indicates that "never" was indeed the better choice.

The song won the Academy Award for Best Original Song, and became Hope's signature tune, with many different lyrics adapted to any situation. In 2004, it finished No. 63 on AFI's 100 Years...100 Songs survey of top tunes in American cinema.

The success of the song resulted in another film starring the same couple. This follow-up film to The Big Broadcast of 1938 is somewhat confusing because it was given the title Thanks for the Memory but the song of that name does not feature. The main song from this latter film was "Two Sleepy People" and this is often bracketed with its forerunner as the best romantic duet of Bob Hope's career. It was written in September 1938 by Hoagy Carmichael with lyrics by Frank Loesser, and was once again performed by Bob Hope and Shirley Ross. The film Thanks for the Memory was released in 1938.

Cover versions
Shep Fields and his Rippling Rhythm Orchestra with vocalist Bobby Goday recorded the song in 1937. Bluebird Records B-7318-A 
Martha Tilton sang vocals with Benny Goodman's orchestra recorded on December 2, 1937. RCA Camden Records CAL-872
Mildred Bailey recorded the song on January 10, 1938 with a mixed group featuring Chu Berry doing a nice tenor sax solo.
Ella Fitzgerald recorded this with André Previn and his orchestra in 1955 (released as a single and on Sweet and Hot) and on her 1967 Verve release Whisper Not, with backing by Marty Paich and his orchestra.
Bing Crosby recorded the song for his 1956 album, Songs I Wish I Had Sung the First Time Around.
Jane Morgan for her album The American Girl from Paris (1956)
Jim Hall recorded an arrangement on his 1957 debut album Jazz Guitar
Sarah Vaughan recorded the tune for her 1958 album After Hours at the London House. She was apparently seeing the lyrics for the first time, as she stumbled over the term Parthenon twice before getting it right.
Anita O'Day on the 1962 album Anita O'Day and Cal Tjader: Time for 2
Harry Nilsson released a version on his 1973 album recorded with Gordon Jenkins, A Little Touch of Schmilsson in the Night. 
Wayne Shorter played a saxophone rendition on the 1979 Weather Report live album 8:30. 
Frank Sinatra recorded an extended version of the song with altered lyrics for his 1981 album, She Shot Me Down.
Susannah McCorkle – Thanks For The Memory – Songs Of Leo Robin (1983), Most Requested Songs (2001)
Rosemary Clooney on her 1985 album Rosemary Clooney Sings Ballads.
Stacey Kent – included the tune on her 2001 Dreamsville album.
Rod Stewart as the title track to his 2005 album Thanks for the Memory: The Great American Songbook, Volume IV.

Parodies
Charlie and his Orchestra, a Nazi-sponsored German propaganda swing band, produced a version during World War II.
The song was performed by Bob Hope, Lucille Ball, and Desi Arnaz on the episode "Lucy and Bob Hope" on the television sitcom I Love Lucy.
Marilyn Monroe's performance of "Happy Birthday, Mr. President" to U.S. President John F. Kennedy in 1962 was followed by an additional verse sung to the tune of "Thanks for the Memory": "Thanks, Mr. President/For all the things you've done/The battles that you've won/The way you deal with U.S. Steel/And our problems by the ton/We thank you so much."
The song was parodied as "Thanks for the Medicare" on one episode of the 1980s NBC-TV sitcom The Golden Girls.  Estelle Getty's character, Sophia Petrillo, sang these lyrics to the melody of the song: "Thanks for the Medicare/For Blue Cross and Blue Shield/For a hip that finally healed/Remember, on prescriptions, generic is a steal/We thank you so much."
The song was used a special version for the closing of NBC Nightly News as Tom Brokaw appears his final broadcast in December 1, 2004.
Connie Chung sang a rendition of it with her husband Maury Povich on the final episode of their show Weekends with Maury and Connie in 2006. 
Judi Dench sang her own "thank you" version especially for Sir Michael Parkinson on his final show - The Final Conversation - in December 2007.

References 

Songs about nostalgia
Songs about parting
Best Original Song Academy Award-winning songs
Songs with lyrics by Leo Robin
Songs with music by Ralph Rainger
1938 singles
Bob Hope songs
Dorothy Lamour songs
Marilyn Monroe songs
Mildred Bailey songs
1938 songs